There have been three baronetcies created for persons with the surname Sharp, one in the Baronetage of Nova Scotia and two in the Baronetage of the United Kingdom.

The Sharp Baronetcy, of Scotscraig in the County of Fife, was created in the Baronetage of Nova Scotia on 21 April 1683. For more information on this creation, see Bethune baronets.

The Sharp Baronetcy, of Heckmondwike in the West Riding of the County of York, was created in the Baronetage of the United Kingdom on 28 June 1920 for Milton Sharp. He was Chairman of the Bradford Dyers' Association Ltd.

The Sharp Baronetcy, of Warden Court in the Borough of Maidstone in the County of Kent, was created in the Baronetage of the United Kingdom on 23 June 1922 for Edward Sharp. He was the founder and chairman of Edward Sharp & Sons, manufacturing confectioners, of Maidstone.

Sharp baronets, of Scotscraig (1683)
see Bethune baronets

Sharp baronets, of Heckmondwike (1920)
Sir Milton Sheridan Sharp, 1st Baronet (1856–1924)
Sir Milton Sharp, 2nd Baronet (1880–1941)
Sir Milton Reginald Sharp, 3rd Baronet (1909–1996)
Sir Sheridan Christopher Robin Sharp, 4th Baronet (1936–2014)
Sir Fabian Alexander Sebastian Sharp, 5th Baronet (born 1973)

Sharp baronets, of Warden Court (1922)

Sir Edward Sharp, 1st Baronet (1854–1931)
Sir Herbert Edward Sharp, 2nd Baronet (1879–1936)
Sir Edward Herbert Sharp, 3rd Baronet (1927–1985)
Sir Adrian Sharp, 4th Baronet (born 1951)

References

Kidd, Charles, Williamson, David (editors). Debrett's Peerage and Baronetage (1990 edition). New York: St Martin's Press, 1990.

Baronetcies in the Baronetage of the United Kingdom
Extinct baronetcies in the Baronetage of Nova Scotia